The Yemen Military Museum or The Military Museum is a museum in central Sana'a, Yemen. It is located on the southwestern corner of the Al-Tahrir Square, next to the National Library of Yemen. It has a wide range of artifacts from ancient artifacts to items during the British occupation and subsequent revolution.

See also
 List of museums in Yemen

References

Buildings and structures in Sanaa
Museums in Yemen